Talgat Maruanuly Baysufinov (Talğat Maruanūly Baisufinov; born on 4 September 1968), is a Kazakh football coach and former player.

Career

Club team
Baysufinov was the pupil of Pavlodar football team. According to the press, for the Pavlodar football club in 1985–1986, 1989, 1992–1995, 1998–1999, Talgat Baysufinov played 180 matches and scored 26 goals (including the Kazakhstan championship 110 games and 17 goals). Also he played for the team "" (Ermak, today Aksu), "Yenbek" from Zhezkazgan, "Zhetysu" in Taldykorgan, "Mangistau" in Aktau, "Ekibastuz" from Ekibastuz, east from Ust-Kamenogorsk.

National team

June 1, 1992, Baysufinov held a debut match for the national team of Kazakhstan, replacing Vahid Masudov in the game with the national team against Turkmenistan at the 73rd minute mark. It was the very first match in the history of Kazakhstan.

Coaching

He began coaching "Aksu" from Stepnogorsk, coached "Yesil-Bogatyr" in "Irtysh" on coaching since 2008. In the 2009 season he held with three matches the team: in the Kazakhstan championship team won the victory over "Okzhetpes" 4: 1 "Kyzylzhar" 1: 0, and in the Kazakhstan Cup - won "Ordabasy" 3: 0.

In the 2010 season the team led by him won the bronze medals in the championship of Kazakhstan.

In 2009, a session was held to obtain a coaching license for category A "Giraud" courses, and November 24, 2009 he passed the exam. Since Kazakhstan is no local trainers with the Pro category, the A license gives the right to work the head coach of the local Premier League.

On November 18, 2011,  Baysufinov enrolled in the UEFA program «Jira», has received a pro license, which gives the right to work with the top division teams and national teams. On February 17, 2014, he announced the resignation from the post of "Irtysh" head coach with the wording "for health reasons".

On June 17, 2015, he was appointed head coach of FC Akzhayik, which achieves the first place in the second divine country, but in the next season in the Premier League, things are going well or all successfully. Baysufinov resigned June 19, 2016.

With him, the team has played 17 matches, gaining 3 victories and 2 matches played to a draw, while the team suffered 12 defeats.

He coached the national team of Kazakhstan in 2016–2017.

He was appointed Head Coach of the national youth team of Kazakhstan on 15 January 2018.

Managerial Statistics

References

External links
 
 

1968 births
Living people
People from Pavlodar
Soviet footballers
Kazakhstani footballers
Association football midfielders
Kazakhstan international footballers
FC Irtysh Pavlodar players
FC Zhetysu players
FC Vostok players
Kazakhstani football managers
FC Irtysh Pavlodar managers
FC Akzhayik managers
Kazakhstan national football team managers
Kazakhstan national under-21 football team managers